Eirini Aindili (born 11 March 1983 in Euboia) is a Greek rhythmic gymnast. She won a bronze medal at the 2000 Summer Olympics.

References

External links 
 
 

1983 births
Living people
People from Euboea (regional unit)
Greek rhythmic gymnasts
Olympic gymnasts of Greece
Olympic bronze medalists for Greece
Gymnasts at the 2000 Summer Olympics
Olympic medalists in gymnastics
Medalists at the 2000 Summer Olympics
Sportspeople from Central Greece